Highland Park Historic District may refer to:

in the United States
(by state)
Highland Park Historic District (Denver, Colorado), listed on the NRHP in West Denver, Colorado 
Highland Park (Denver, Colorado), a park that is a historic district listed on the National Register of Historic Places in West Denver, Colorado
Highland Park Neighborhood Historic District, Lafayette, Indiana, listed on the National Register of Historic Places in Tippecanoe County, Indiana
Highland Park Historic Business District at Euclid and Sixth Avenues, Des Moines, Iowa, listed on the National Register of Historic Places in Polk County, Iowa
Highland Park Ford Plant, Highland Park, Michigan
Highland Park (Meridian, Mississippi), a park that is a historic district listed on the National Register of Historic Places in Mississippi
Highland Park Historic District (Saranac Lake, New York), listed on the NRHP in Essex County, New York
Highland Park Residential Historic District, Pittsburgh, Pennsylvania, listed on the National Register of Historic Places in Pittsburgh, Pennsylvania
Highland Park Shopping Village, Highpark, Texas, a National Historic Landmark
Highland Park Historic District (Salt Lake City, Utah), listed on the NRHP in Salt Lake City, Utah 
Highland Park Plaza Historic District, Richmond, Virginia, listed on the National Register of Historic Places in Richmond, Virginia
Highland Park Historic District (Wheeling, West Virginia), listed on the NRHP in Ohio County, West Virginia

See also
Highland Park (disambiguation)
Highland Historic District (disambiguation)